Kinelsky (masculine), Kinelskaya (feminine), or Kinelskoye (neuter) may refer to:
Kinelsky District, a district of Samara Oblast, Russia
Kinelsky (rural locality) (Kinelskaya, Kinelskoye), name of several rural localities in Russia